The Magellanic tuco-tuco (Ctenomys magellanicus) is a species of rodent in the family Ctenomyidae. It is found in Argentina and Chile. Its natural habitat is subtropical or tropical dry lowland grassland. It is also known as the cururo by the Ona culture of Tierra del Fuego.

References

 Wilson, David. Indigenous South Americans of the Past and Present. Westview Press, 1999.

Tuco-tucos
Mammals of Patagonia
Mammals of Argentina
Mammals of Chile
Mammals described in 1836
Taxa named by Frederick Debell Bennett
Taxonomy articles created by Polbot